Stefan Karlsson (born 26 March 1981) is a Swedish snowboarder. He competed at the 2002 Winter Olympics and the 2006 Winter Olympics.

References

External links
 

1981 births
Living people
Swedish male snowboarders
Olympic snowboarders of Sweden
Snowboarders at the 2002 Winter Olympics
Snowboarders at the 2006 Winter Olympics
People from Falun
Sportspeople from Dalarna County
21st-century Swedish people